Ashot Karapetyan (born 9 May 1999) is an Armenian alpine skier. He competed in the 2018 Winter Olympics.

References

1999 births
Living people
Alpine skiers at the 2018 Winter Olympics
Armenian male alpine skiers
Olympic alpine skiers of Armenia